Baleka Mbete (born 24 September 1949) is a South African politician who served as the Speaker of the National Assembly of South Africa from May 2014 to May 2019. She was previously Speaker of the National Assembly from 2004 to 2008, and Deputy President of South Africa from 2008 to 2009 under Kgalema Motlanthe. She was elected National Chairperson of the African National Congress in 2007 and re-elected in 2012 and served until 18 December 2017. On the 18th of December 2017, during the ANC's 54th conference, Gwede Mantashe was elected Mbete's successor as National Chairperson of the ANC.

Mbete is the ex-wife of poet and activist Keorapetse Kgositsile.

Early life
After going into exile in 1976, Mbete taught in Mbabane in Swaziland, and went on to work for the African National Congress (ANC) in several other African cities, including Dar es Salaam in Tanzania, Nairobi in Kenya, Gaborone in Botswana, Harare in Zimbabwe, and Lusaka in Zambia. She returned to South Africa from exile in June 1990.

In the ANC government 
Soon after her return, Mbete was elected the secretary-general of ANC Women's League, serving in this position from 1991 to 1993. She was elected as an MP for the ANC in 1994, and was appointed chair of the ANC parliamentary caucus in 1995, and was the Deputy Speaker of the National Assembly of South Africa from 1996 to 2004. Mbete was also a member of the Presidential Panel on the Truth and Reconciliation Commission, the ANC National Executive Committee, and the Pan-African Parliament.

From April 2004, Mbete became the Speaker of the National Assembly. On 18 December 2007, at the 52nd National Elective Conference of the ANC held in Polokwane, Mbete was elected as the ANC's national chairperson.

Deputy President
On 20 September 2008, the African National Congress formally asked President Thabo Mbeki to resign as President of South Africa. Mbete, as Speaker of Parliament, accepted Mbeki's resignation on 21 September. It had been speculated that Mbete would succeed Mbeki as President, which would have made her the first female head of state in South Africa's history; however, the ANC announced that Kgalema Motlanthe, Deputy President of the ANC, would assume that position. On 23 September, Mbete was announced by the SABC as the most likely candidate for Deputy President of South Africa following Phumzile Mlambo-Ngcuka's resignation from the position. On 25 September 2008, she was appointed by Motlanthe as Deputy President. On 10 May 2009, she was replaced as Deputy President by incoming President Jacob Zuma, who elected to appoint Motlanthe as his deputy.

Speaker of the National Assembly

Nomination
On 20 May 2014, Mbete was nominated for the position of Speaker of the National Assembly for a second time. She was elected unanimously on 21 May, beating her rival DA candidate and former Eastern Cape Premier Nosimo Balindlela. On 10 September 2014, five opposition parties, including the Democratic Alliance and Economic Freedom Fighters, stated that they planned to submit a motion of no confidence in Mbete, and claimed that she could not simultaneously serve as chairwoman of the ANC and as Speaker of the National Assembly. A debate held in Parliament on 16 September resulted in the motion being rejected by 234 votes to none. This was a result of opposition parties collectively walking out of the house after the ANC tried to change the vote into one of confidence in Mbete instead.

Alleged bias
Mbete has faced accusations, over the course of several years, that she is biased in favour of the ANC and a puppet of Ex-president Jacob Zuma. In March 2016, the Constitutional Court held, in Economic Freedom Fighters v Speaker of the National Assembly, that the National Assembly under Mbete's stewardship had breached the South African Constitution by undermining rather than implementing the Public Protector's Nkandla report.

Remuneration
As speaker of the national assembly Mbete was paid R2‚716‚798 (equivalent to US$170,000) a year as of April 2015 making her the highest paid member of the South African Parliament at the time.

Other
As speaker Mbete has highlighted poor attendance of ministers at parliamentary meetings, and implemented an attendance roster.

Succession
On 20 May 2019, the African National Congress announced that it had nominated NCOP Chairperson Thandi Modise to succeed Mbete as Speaker. The following day, Mbete withdrew her name from the ANC's incoming parliamentarians list.

Other controversies 
In April 1997, Mbete was found to have received an improperly issued driver's license. She was not charged with any wrongdoing. This was after investigators uncovered widespread corruption in Mpumalanga's driving license testing centre. Mbete said that she had been "too busy" to stand in queues.

In 2006, Mbete chartered a jet at a cost of R471,900 (around $60,000) to fly to Liberia for the inauguration of Ellen Johnson Sirleaf as president. The only other passenger on the plane was a member of her staff. Then president Thabo Mbeki and foreign minister Nkosazana Dlamini-Zuma also travelled to the inauguration – Mbeki in his private plane and Dlamini-Zuma by commercial flight.

Mbete has been a staunch supporter of Tony Yengeni, a former ANC Chief Whip in parliament, who was convicted of defrauding parliament in 2004, even accompanying Yengeni to Pollsmoor Prison when he reported to serve his sentence.

Mbete's links to business have also been questioned. She and provincial secretary of the ANC in the Northern Cape Dr K M Seimelo are shareholders in Dyambu Holdings, which is involved in building the massive Gautrain public transport project in the province Gauteng. Dyambu Holdings is reported to have had links with slain magnate Brett Kebble. In 2010, she was implicated in a R25 million Gold Fields bribe under the guise of a "BEE" transaction by US investigators.

References

|-

|-

1949 births
Living people
20th-century South African women politicians
20th-century South African politicians
21st-century South African women politicians
21st-century South African politicians
African National Congress politicians
Deputy presidents of South Africa
Members of the Pan-African Parliament from South Africa
Speakers of the National Assembly of South Africa
Women members of the Pan-African Parliament
Women vice presidents
Women legislative speakers
Women members of the National Assembly of South Africa
Members of the National Assembly of South Africa
Kgositsile family